URA House, also URA Tower, is a building in Uganda, that serves as the headquarters of Uganda Revenue Authority (URA).

Location
The coordinates of URA House are 0°19'49.0"N, 32°37'10.0"E (Latitude:0.330278; Longitude:32.619444).

Overview
Prior to 2015, the offices of URA were scattered in multiple rented locations across the city of Kampala. As of August 2016, URA spent US$3.5 million in rent and US$1.5 million in operational expenses annually.

In February 2015, the agency began construction of a 22-storey skyscraper to consolidate all the agency offices in the city under one roof and save money in rent and operational expenses. Completion was scheduled for 2018. URA plans to use the savings to improve its upcountry offices.

As of July 2018, the building was nearly complete, with commissioning expected during the second half of 2018. The tarmac road, Walusimbi Lane, from Nakawa to the new building, has been completed at a cost of USh2.57 billion (approx. US$680,000), funded by the Ugandan government. The URA House itself was budgeted at USh140 billion (approx. US$37 million), in construction costs.

On 19 January 2019, the president of Uganda Yoweri Museveni, officially commissioned the completed skyscraper.

Properties
Maximum occupancy is calculated at 1,700 people. There is provision for underground parking for 360 cars, and surface parking for 710 vehicles. The parking structure measures , on five levels for parking and the sixth level designed with space for a breastfeeding centre for staff.

See also
 Kampala Capital City Authority
 List of tallest buildings in Kampala
 Uganda Ministry of Finance
 Nakawa Division
 Electricity Regulatory Authority House

References

External links
 Website of Uganda Revenue Authority
 URA marks 25 years, sees growth from USh180 billion to  USh11 trillion
 URA Headquarters To Move Into New Building In January As of 5 December 2018.

Buildings and structures in Kampala
Skyscraper office buildings in Uganda
Buildings and structures completed in 2019
2019 establishments in Uganda
Nakawa Division
Government buildings in Uganda